The Internet Research Task Force (IRTF) is managed by the IRTF chair in consultation with the Internet Research Steering Group (IRSG). The IRSG membership includes the IRTF chair, the chairs of the various IRTF research groups and other individuals (members at large) from the research or IETF communities.

IRSG members at large are chosen by the IRTF chair in consultation with the rest of the IRSG and on approval by the Internet Architecture Board.

In addition to managing the research groups, the IRSG may from time to time hold topical workshops focusing on research areas of importance to the evolution of the Internet, or more general workshops to, for example, discuss research priorities from an Internet perspective.

The IRSG also reviews and approves documents published as part of the IRTF document stream (RFC 5743).

External links
IRTF Homepage
Internet Speed Test
RFC 2014 - IRTF Research Group Guidelines and Procedures

Internet governance organizations